The Lepidosauria (from Greek meaning scaled lizards) is a subclass or superorder of reptiles, containing the orders Squamata and Rhynchocephalia. Squamata includes snakes, lizards, and amphisbaenians. Squamata contains over 9,000 species, making it by far the most species-rich and diverse order of reptiles in the present day. Rhynchocephalia was a formerly widespread and diverse group of reptiles in the Mesozoic Era. However, it is represented by only one living species: the tuatara (Sphenodon punctatus), a superficially lizard-like reptile native to New Zealand.

Lepidosauria is a monophyletic group (i.e. a clade), containing all descendants of the last common ancestor of squamates and rhynchocephalians. Lepidosaurs can be distinguished from other reptiles via several traits, such as large keratinous scales which may overlap one another. Purely in the context of modern taxa, Lepidosauria can be considered the sister taxon to Archosauria, which includes Aves (birds) and Crocodilia. Testudines (turtles) may be related to lepidosaurs or to archosaurs, but no consensus has been reached on this subject. Lepidosauria is encompassed by Lepidosauromorpha, a broader group defined as all reptiles (living or extinct) closer to lepidosaurs than to archosaurs.

Evolution

Lizards were originally split into two clades: the Iguania and the Scleroglossa. Snakes and amphisbaenians belong within the clade Scleroglossa. Analysis of teeth has indicated that Iguania is made up of the sister taxa Chamaeleonidae and Agamidae. Snakes are actually a branch within the lizard group. In fact, some lizards, such as the Varanids, are more closely related to snakes than they are to other lizards. Varanids are a diverse group of lizards living from Africa, throughout south, central, and east Asia, as well as the Indo-Pacific islands and Australia.

Snakes currently have about 3,070 extant species, which are grouped into the scolecophidians and the alethinophidians. The scolecophidians comprise about 370 species and are represented by small snakes with a limited gape size. The alethinophidians comprise about 2,700 species and are represented by the more common snakes. As snakes evolved, their gape size increased from the narrowness of the scolecophidians, which allowed for the digestion of larger prey. There are about 600 species of venomous snakes, which all belong to Caenophidia, although the majority of caenophidians are non-venomous colubrids.

While amphisbaenians are mostly limbless, three species have reduced forms of front limbs. Morphological data shows that species with front limbs form a sister group to those that are limbless. This means that the amphisbaenians’ loss of limbs occurred only once.

A genetic study on the genome of the tuatara suggests a divergence rate of around 240 million years ago during the Triassic.

Fossil record

Snakes do not have an extensive fossil record; the oldest known fossil is from between early and late Cretaceous period. There were Tertiary fossil snakes that became extinct by the end of the Eocene period. The first colubrid also appeared in the Eocene period. Lizards first appeared in the middle Jurassic period, and this is when the scincomorph and the anguimorph lizards were first seen. The Gekkotans first appear in the late Jurassic period and the iguanians first appear in the late Cretaceous period. The lizards of the Cretaceous period represent extinct genera and species. The majority of amphisbaenians first appeared during the early Cenozoic period. Rhynchocephalian fossils first appear in the Middle Triassic period, between 238-240 million years ago, making them the earliest lepidosaurian fossils found to date. The tuatara can now only be found on small islands off the New Zealand coast. However, fossil records show that it once lived on mainland New Zealand and Rhynchocephalia as a whole was once distributed globally.

The Rhynchocephalia originated by the Middle Triassic period and were distributed worldwide. Except for the single species of tuatara that now lives in New Zealand, all species became extinct in the late Cretaceous, although material is known from the Miocene of New Zealand. This extinction is associated with the introduction of mammals, such as rats. The modern tuatara's skull anatomy is significantly different from the best known Mesozoic taxa. Wild populations of tuatara can be found on 32 islands; in addition to three islands in which populations have formed due to migration.

Description

Extant reptiles are in the clade Diapsida, named for a pair of temporal fenestrations on each side of the skull. Until recently, Diapsida was said to be composed of Lepidosauria and their sister taxa Archosauria. The subclass Lepidosauria is then split into Squamata and Rhynchocephalia. More recent morphological studies and molecular studies also place turtles firmly within Diapsida, even though they lack temporal fenestrations.

The group Squamata includes snakes, lizards, and amphisbaenians. Squamata can be characterized by the reduction or loss of limbs. Snakes, some lizards, and most amphisbaenians have evolved the complete loss of their limbs. The skin of all squamates is covered in scales. The upper jaw of Squamates is movable on the cranium, a configuration called kinesis. This is made possible by a loose connection between the quadrate and its neighboring bones. Without this, snakes would not be able consume prey that are much larger than themselves. However, the tuatara does not share this characteristic with the other Lepidosauria. Amphisbaenians are mostly legless like snakes, but are generally much smaller. Three species of amphisbaenians have kept reduced front limbs and these species are known for actively burrowing in the ground.

Rhynchocephalia, which includes the tuatara and their extinct relatives, can presently only be found on some small islands off New Zealand. The tuatara has amphicoelous vertebrae, which means that the vertebrae are hollowed out at both ends. Tuataras also have the ability to autotomize their tails. A well-developed median or pineal eye is present on the top of the head (parietal region) and an additional row of upper teeth is located on the palatine bone.

Diagnosis

The reptiles in the subclass Lepidosauria can be distinguished from other reptiles by a variety of characteristics. First, the males have evolved a hemipenis instead of a single penis with erectile tissue that is found in crocodilians, birds, mammals, and turtles. The hemipenis can be found in the base of the tail. The tuatara has not fully evolved the hemipenis, but instead has shallow paired outpocketings of the posterior wall of the cloaca that have been determined to be precursors to the hemipenis.

Second, most lepidosaurs have the ability to autotomize their tails. However, this trait has been lost on some recent species. In lizards, fracture planes are present within the vertebrae of the tail that allow for its removal. Some lizards have multiple fracture planes, while others just have a single fracture plane. The regrowth of the tail is not always complete and is made of a solid rod of cartilage rather than individual vertebrae. In snakes, the tail separates between vertebrae and some do not experience regrowth.

Third, the scales in lepidosaurs are horny (keratinized) structures of the epidermis, allowing them to be shed collectively, contrary to the scutes seen in other reptiles. This is done in different cycles, depending on the species. However, lizards generally shed in flakes while snakes shed in one piece. Unlike scutes, lepidosaur scales will often overlap like roof tiles.

Biology and ecology

Squamates are represented by viviparous, ovoviviparous, and oviparous species. Viviparous means that the female gives birth to live young, Ovoviviparous means that the egg will develop inside the female's body and Oviparous means that the female lays eggs. A few species within Squamata have the ability to reproduce asexually. The tuatara lays eggs that are usually about one inch in length and which take about 14 months to incubate.

While in the egg, the Squamata embryo develops an egg tooth on the premaxillary that helps the animal emerge from the egg. A reptile will increase three to twentyfold in length from hatching to adulthood. There are three main life history events that lepidosaurs reach: hatching/birth, sexual maturity, and reproductive senility.

Because gular pumping is so common in lepidosaus, and is also found in the tuatara, it is assumed that it is an original trait in the group.

Most lepidosaurs rely on camouflage as one of their main defenses. Some species have evolved to blend in with their ecosystem, while others are able change their skin color to blend in with their current surroundings. The ability to autotomize the tail is another defense that is common among lepidosaurs. Other species, such as the Echinosauria, have evolved the defense of feigning death.

Hunting and diet

Viperines can sense their prey's infrared radiation through bare nerve endings on the skin of their heads. Also, viperines and some boids have thermal receptors that allow them to target their prey's heat. Many snakes are able to obtain their prey through constriction. This is done by first biting the prey, then coiling their body around the prey. The snake then tightens its grip as the prey struggles, which leads to suffocation. Some snakes have fangs that produce venomous bites, which allows the snake to consume unconscious, or even dead, prey. Also, some venoms include a proteolytic component that aids in digestion. Chameleons grasp their prey with a projectile tongue. This is made possible by a hyoid mechanism, which is the contraction of the hyoid muscle that drives the tip of the tongue outwards.

Within the subclass Lepidosauria there are herbivores, omnivores, insectivores, and carnivores. The herbivores consist of iguanines, some agamids, and some skinks. Most lizard species and some snake species are insectivores. The remaining snake species, tuataras, and amphisbaenians, are carnivores. While some snake species are generalist, others eat a narrow range of prey - for example, Salvadora only eat lizards. The remaining lizards are omnivores and can consume plants or insects. The broad carnivorous diet of the tuatara may be facilitated by its specialised shearing mechanism, which involves a forward movement of the lower jaw following jaw closure.

While birds, including raptors, wading birds and roadrunners, and mammals are known to prey on reptiles, the major predator is other reptiles. Some reptiles eat reptile eggs, for example the diet of the Nile monitor includes crocodile eggs, and small reptiles are preyed upon by larger ones.

Conservation

The geographic ranges of lepidosaurs are vast and cover all but the most extreme cold parts of the globe. Amphisbaenians exist in Florida, mainland Mexico, including Baja California, the Mediterranean region, the Middle East, North Africa, sub-Saharan Africa, South America, and the Caribbean. The tuatara is confined to only a few rocky islands of New Zealand, where it digs burrows to live in and preys mostly on insects.

Climate change has led to the need for conservation efforts to protect the existence of the tuatara. This is because it is not possible for this species to migrate on its own to cooler areas. Conservationists are beginning to consider the possibility of translocating them to islands with cooler climates. The range of the tuatara has already been minimized by the introduction of cats, rats, dogs, and mustelids to New Zealand. The eradication of the mammals from the islands where the tuatara still survives has helped the species increase its population. An experiment observing the tuatara population after the removal of the Polynesian rat showed that the tuatara expressed an island-specific increase of population after the rats' removal. However, it may be difficult to keep these small mammals from reinhabiting these islands.

Habitat destruction is the leading negative impact of humans on reptiles. Humans continue to develop land that is important habitat for the lepidosaurs. The clear-cutting of land has also led to habitat reduction. Some snakes and lizards migrate toward human dwellings because there is an abundance of rodent and insect prey. However, these reptiles are seen as pests and are often exterminated.

Interactions with humans

Snakes are commonly feared throughout the world. Bounties were paid for dead cobras under the British Raj in India; similarly, there have been advertised rattlesnake roundups in North America. Data shows that between 1959 and 1986 an average of 5,563 rattlesnakes were killed per year in Sweetwater, Texas, due to rattlesnake roundups, and these roundups have led to documented declines and local extirpations of rattlesnake populations, especially Eastern Diamondbacks in Georgia.

People have introduced species to the lepidosaurs' natural habitats that have increased predation on the reptiles. For example, mongooses were introduced to Jamaica from India to control the rat infestation in sugar cane fields. As a result, the mongooses fed on the lizard population of Jamaica, which has led to the elimination or decrease of many lizard species. Actions can be taken by humans to help endangered reptiles. Some species are unable to be bred in captivity, but others have thrived. There is also the option of animal refuges. This concept is helpful to contain the reptiles and keep them from human dwellings. However, environmental fluctuations and predatorial attacks still occur in refuges.

Reptile skins are still being sold. Accessories, such as shoes, boots, purses, belts, buttons, wallets, and lamp shades, are all made out of reptile skin. In 1986, the World Resource Institute estimated that 10.5 million reptile skins were traded legally. This total does not include the illegal trades of that year. Horned lizards are popularly harvested and stuffed. Some humans are making a conscious effort to preserve the remaining species of reptiles, however.

References

External links

 Animaldiversity.ummz.umich.edu
 Reptile taxonomy, Benton 2004
 Lepidosaur phylogeny

 
Chordate superorders
Ladinian first appearances
Extant Middle Triassic first appearances